Chur Altstadt railway station is a small railway station (essentially a street halt) on the Chur–Arosa railway (the "Arosabahn") of the Rhaetian Railway (RhB). It is situated near the old town (Altstadt) of Chur, on Plessurquai by the Plessur river, less than a kilometre (0.76 km) from the main railway station of the city. It was called Chur Stadt railway station until 8 December 2018.

The halt is closer to the shops, bars and attractions of the old town than the main station. A number of local and Postauto (see below) bus services converge at Malteser, located nearby where Grabenstrasse and Engadinstrasse converge. A footbridge ("Praximerbrüggli") connects the halt with Lindenquai, on the other side of the river.

Stadtbahn

The Chur stadtbahn ("town railway") is the part of the RhB line from Chur to Arosa which passes through the centre of the city of Chur, with on-street running. The line starts on Bahnhofplatz, in front of the main railway station, where that station's platforms for the Arosa line are. The line runs along Engadinstrasse from the Bahnhofplatz to the old town, where it then runs briefly along Grabenstrasse and then alongside the Plessur river on Plessurquai ("Plessur Quay"). After Chur Altstadt station, the line continues to run on the road alongside the river, heading up into the suburb of Sand and along Sandstrasse, which is the location of a compact permanent way depot ("Chur Sand") at 1.42 km from the beginning of the line. Shortly after Sand, at Sassal (where there was once a small station on the line, now not used) the line diverges from the road, which crosses the Plessau, and begins its mountainous assent via the Sassal tunnels.

Postauto connection
Postauto bus services 90.001 (to Tamins and Rhäzüns), 90.041 (to Peist), 90.042 (to Tschiertschen), and 90.181/182 (to Lenzerheide, Tiefencastel, Bivio and St. Moritz) call at the nearby Malteser bus stop.

Services
The following services stop at Chur Altstadt:

Gallery

References

External links

 

Railway stations in Switzerland opened in 1914
Railway stations in Graubünden
Rhaetian Railway stations
Street running
Transport in Chur